Hydrophis stricticollis, commonly called the collared sea snake, is a species of venomous sea snake in the family Elapidae.

Description
Scales on thickest part of body subquadrangular or hexagonal in shape, feebly imbricate or juxtaposed; 8-11 maxillary teeth behind fangs; head small, body long and slender anteriorly, posteriorly 2.5 to 3 times thicker than anteriorly; 1 anterior temporal, rarely divided; 7-8 upper labials, second in contact with prefrontal, 3-4 border eye; 34-41 scale rows around neck, 45-55 around midbody; ventrals 374–452, distinct throughout, less than twice as large as adjacent body scales; grayish to olive above, yellowish below, with 45-65 dark bands, widest dorsally, disappearing with age; head black or olive, yellow markings on snout and along sides of head. Total length, males , females ; tail length, males , females .

Geographic range
Indian Ocean (Sri Lanka, India, Myanmar [formerly Burma], Bangladesh)

References

Further reading
 Günther, A. 1864. The Reptiles of British India. The Ray Society. (R. Hardwicke, publisher; Taylor & Francis, printers.) London. xxvii + 452 pp.

stricticollis
Reptiles described in 1864
Taxa named by Albert Günther